Bargeddie railway station is located in the village of Bargeddie, North Lanarkshire, Scotland, situated between the city of Glasgow and the town of Coatbridge. It opened in 1993 under British Rail and SPTE, and is on the site of an earlier station called 'Drumpark'. It is on the Whifflet Line (a branch of the more extensive Argyle Line), 9¼ miles (15 km) east of Glasgow Central railway station. Train services are provided by ScotRail.

Services 

A half-hourly service operates between Glasgow Central (Low Level) and Whifflet stations, on Mondays to Saturdays.

References 

Railway stations in North Lanarkshire
Railway stations opened by British Rail
Railway stations in Great Britain opened in 1993
Railway stations served by ScotRail